Uvs is a province in Mongolia.

Uvs or UVS may also refer to:

 Europa Ultraviolet Spectrograph
 UVS (Juno)
 Uvs Lake, in Mongolia and Russia
 Uvs Lake Basin, in Mongolia and Russia
 UVS (football), association football club in Leiden, Netherland. Former professional club.